The Ministry of Digital Economy and Entrepreneurship (formerly: The Ministry of Communications and Information Technology) of Jordan is the body responsible for setting policies and legislation to regulate the information technology, communications and postal sector, complementing and sustaining the e-government network in Jordan, in addition to supporting initiatives in the field of communications and technology. Previously, the post, telegraph and telephone sector fell under the responsibility of the Ministry of Communications, but due to the development of the communications sector, the Ministry was created. The Jordan Post Company became affiliated with the Ministry; further responsibilities were added to it.

History 
In May 2019, the name of the ministry was changed to: “The Ministry of Digital Economy and Entrepreneurship”, with the aim of supporting the digital transformation process and adopting the concepts of the digital economy, in addition to facilitating and developing the entrepreneurship system in Jordan.

References

External links 

 Ministry of Digital Economy and Entrepreneurship

Government ministries of Jordan